Ronald Gerritse (22 September 1952 – 26 September 2013) was a Dutch civil servant, who served as the chair of the Authority for the Financial Markets and as Treasurer-General at the Ministry of Finance.

Education and career 
Gerritse was born in 1952 in the village Jutphaas in the province Utrecht. He studied economics at the Vrije Universiteit Amsterdam until 1977. He started his career at the Institute for Government Expenditure Research and received his doctor's degree in 1982 while working there. His dissertation was titled "The realm of necessity; an analysis of the industrial business cycle in socialist Czechoslovakia".

Gerritse also worked for the parliamentary inquiry into shipbuilder Rijn-Schelde-Verolme. He left the institute to take a job at the Ministry of Social Affairs and Employment in 1984. Three years later, Gerritse returned to the government expenditure institute to serve as its director. Afterwards, he held the position of general-secretary at the Social and Economic Council.

He was the secretary-general of the Ministry of Social Affairs and Employment between February 1996 and March 2003. Gerritse became the secretary-general of the Ministry of Finance in the latter year. Besides this job, he started serving as Treasurer-General in 2008. In these positions, he was involved in the nationalization of the bank ABN AMRO and the Dutch subsidiary of Fortis during the Great Recession.

Gerritse left the finance ministry in May 2011 to work as the chairman of the Authority for the Financial Markets (AFM). Gerritse died on 26 September 2013 aged 61. His duties had been taken over by a member of the executive board since June, when treatment had started for a disease in Gerritse's bone marrow.

Personal life 
Gerritse was married to his wife and had two children.

References 

1952 births
2013 deaths
20th-century Dutch civil servants
20th-century Dutch economists
21st-century Dutch civil servants
21st-century Dutch economists
Vrije Universiteit Amsterdam alumni
Treasurers-General